José Isidoro Gómez Torres (born 1 August 1986), known simply as Isidoro, is a Spanish former professional footballer, currently assistant manager of Norwegian club IK Junkeren. Mainly a right-back, he could play occasionally on the other flank.

Club career
A product of Real Betis' youth system, Isidoro was born in Pedrera, Seville, and he made his first appearance with the first team in a 1–1 draw with Real Madrid at the Santiago Bernabéu in a Copa del Rey game, with Betis winning the tie on the away goals rule. Under the guidance of manager Luis Fernández, he played six consecutive La Liga matches (all starts) after his debut on 17 February 2007, also against Real Madrid and away (0–0 draw); he was promoted to the main squad at the same time as Juande, but remained registered with the reserves for a further three full seasons.

Isidoro appeared in 31 games for the Andalusians in the 2010–11 campaign, as they returned to the top division after a two-year absence. He moved abroad on 27 August 2012, signing a two-year contract with Polish club Polonia Warsaw; he was released on 25 November, after only five official appearances.

In the following years, Isidoro competed in his country's second tier, in representation of CD Numancia, Elche CF and UD Almería. In January 2018, he joined FK Bodø/Glimt from the Norwegian Eliteserien.

Isidoro retired at the end of 2019 aged 33, being immediately appointed assistant manager of Bodø/Glimt's lowly neighbours IK Junkeren. He also worked at their academy.

Career statistics

Club

References

External links

1986 births
Living people
People from Sierra Sur (Seville)
Sportspeople from the Province of Seville
Spanish footballers
Footballers from Andalusia
Association football defenders
La Liga players
Segunda División players
Segunda División B players
Tercera División players
Betis Deportivo Balompié footballers
Real Betis players
CD Numancia players
Elche CF players
UD Almería players
Ekstraklasa players
Polonia Warsaw players
Eliteserien players
FK Bodø/Glimt players
Spanish expatriate footballers
Expatriate footballers in Poland
Expatriate footballers in Norway
Spanish expatriate sportspeople in Poland
Spanish expatriate sportspeople in Norway